António José, ou O Poeta e a Inquisição (in ) is a theatre play by Gonçalves de Magalhães, the first Brazilian Romantic author. Written in and performed for the first time in 1838, it was published in that same year. It is considered to be the first play of a "pure" Brazilian theatre.

Its plot is loosely based on the final days of Luso-Brazilian Jewish playwright António José da Silva, who was garroted and later burned by the Inquisition.

References

External links
 The play 

1838 plays
Brazilian plays
1838 books
Plays set in Portugal
Plays set in Brazil
Cultural depictions of writers
Cultural depictions of poets
Cultural depictions of Portuguese men
Cultural depictions of Brazilian men
Plays set in the 18th century
Plays based on real people